The Gruffalo River Ride Adventure is a dark water ride that opened in March 2017 at Chessington World of Adventures Resort in Greater London, England, developed by Merlin Entertainments. It takes riders through scenes based on The Gruffalo franchise. The scenes consist largely of digital projection and include clips from the 2009 animated film The Gruffalo.

Ride experience
From the entrance, riders then enter a station decorated with stage-flats and leaves suspended from the ceiling.

The scenes throughout the ride depict the Gruffalo story, using screens, ambient lighting, projections and animations. The ride ending retains the two smaller of the three sets of fountains from its predecessor Bubbleworks.

An on-ride photo is taken as the boat drops down a ramp into the final scene.

History

The original Prof. Burp's BubbleWorks ride operated for fifteen years, before being redesigned for a sponsorship deal at the end of 2005, without the involvement of the ride's original designers. During this refurbishment, the ride's factory theme was changed to suit the new sponsor Imperial Leather, with most of the animations and effects removed. By 2014 the Imperial Leather sponsorship had expired and so the brand logos were removed, but the ride remained in a poor condition. On 6 September 2016, the ride closed and the remaining props were auctioned off.

On 1 January 2017, Chessington announced that The Gruffalo River Ride Adventure would replace Bubbleworks. The new ride was produced by Merlin Magic Making and officially opened on 18 March 2017, with the surrounding Transylvania area renamed 'Wild Woods'.

The Gruffalo River Ride Adventure features far fewer animations, props and scenic detail than the original Prof. Burp's Bubble Works, instead employing TV screens and projected images on to whited-out sets, with the remaining spaces shrouded in darkness. Since the building was built to accommodate the original larger and more detailed scenes from Prof. Burp's Bubble Works, most of the Gruffalo sets were simply built in front of the old scenes. However, smell pods were added to give a better effect for the forest at one point which were received well.

References

External links

2017 establishments in England
Chessington World of Adventures rides
Water rides manufactured by Mack Rides
Amusement rides based on film franchises
Animatronic attractions
Cultural infrastructure completed in 2017
Amusement rides introduced in 2017
Donaldson and Scheffler